Charopella zela, also known as the Mount Gower banded pinwheel snail, is a species of air-breathing land snail, a terrestrial pulmonate gastropod mollusc in the pinwheel snail family, that is endemic to Australia's Lord Howe Island in the Tasman Sea.

Description
The shell of these snails are 1.6–1.9 mm in height, with a diameter of 3 mm. The colour is cream with dark orange-brown flammulations (flame-like markings). The shape is discoidal with a moderately raised spire, whorls shouldered with an angulate periphery, with coarse, moderately closely-spaced radial ribs. The umbilicus is moderately widely open. The aperture is rounded and lunate. The animal is unknown.

Distribution and habitat
This very rare snail is known only from the summit of Mount Gower and the upper slopes of Mount Lidgbird, and has never been collected alive.

References

 
 

 
zela
Gastropods of Lord Howe Island
Taxa named by Tom Iredale
Gastropods described in 1944